In mathematics, Tate cohomology groups are a slightly modified form of the usual cohomology groups of a finite group that combine homology and cohomology groups into one sequence.

Definition
The Tate cohomology groups  are defined by
 quotient of norm 0 elements of A by principal elements of A,

Properties

 If 

is a short exact sequence of G-modules, then we get the usual long exact sequence of Tate cohomology groups:

 If A is an induced G module then all Tate cohomology groups of A vanish.
 The zeroth Tate cohomology group of A is 
(Fixed points of G on A)/(Obvious fixed points of G acting on A)
where by the "obvious" fixed point we mean those of the form . In other words, the zeroth cohomology group in some sense describes the non-obvious fixed points of G acting on A.

The Tate cohomology groups are characterized by the three properties above.

Tate's theorem

Tate's theorem  gives conditions for multiplication by a cohomology class to be an isomorphism between cohomology groups. There are several slightly different versions of it; a version that is particularly convenient for class field theory is as follows:

 is trivial, and 
Then  cup product with a is an isomorphism:

for all n; in other words the graded Tate cohomology of A is isomorphic to 
the Tate cohomology with integral coefficients, with the degree shifted by 2.

Tate-Farrell cohomology
F. Thomas Farrell extended Tate cohomology groups to the case of all groups G of finite virtual cohomological dimension. In Farrell's theory, the groups 
 are isomorphic to the usual cohomology groups whenever n is greater than the virtual cohomological dimension of the group G. Finite groups have virtual cohomological dimension 0, and in this case Farrell's cohomology groups are the same as those of Tate.

See also
Herbrand quotient
Class formation

References
 M. F. Atiyah and C. T. C. Wall, "Cohomology of Groups", in Algebraic Number Theory by J. W. S. Cassels, A. Frohlich , Chapter IV.  See section 6.

 

Class field theory
Homological algebra
Finite groups